IOM may refer to:
 Indian Order of Merit, a military and civilian decoration in British India.
 Infraorbital margin, the lower margin of the eye socket
 Institute of Medicine, a not-for-profit, non-governmental American organization founded in 1970
 Institute of Medicine, Nepal, a medical school in Kathmandu, Nepal
 Institute of Occupational Medicine in the UK
 Institute for Organization Management, an Affiliate organization of the United States Chamber of Commerce
 Institute of Oriental Manuscripts of the Russian Academy of Sciences
 Integrated Object Model, an Application Programming Interface used in SAS (software) 9.1+ Integration Technologies
 International Organization for Migration, a United Nations agency
 International One Metre (radiosailing), a class of radio sailing boat
 Intraoperative monitoring (neurophysiogical testing during surgery)
 IOM soybeans, an industrial designation for soybeans from the U.S. states of Indiana, Ohio, and Michigan
 ISDN-oriented Modular Interface
 Isle of Man, a self-governing British Crown Dependency, located in the Irish Sea
 Isle of Man Airport, its IATA airport code
 Jupiter (mythology), or Jupiter Optimus Maximus, king of the Roman gods